Iniistius aneitensis, the yellowblotch razorfish, is a species of marine ray-finned fish 
from the family Labridae, the wrasses. It is found in the Indo-Pacific.  

References

aneitensis
Taxa named by Albert Günther
Fish described in 1862